The SCR-108 Radio Truck was a Signal Corps Radio vehicle used by the United States Army during and after World War I for short range air-to-ground communications,

Use
This truck was assigned to squadron headquarters in order to communicate with the SCR-68 airplane radio as well as the others in its class. eventually replaced by the SCR-197 mobile radio station. The van is described as having room for 3 operators and one squadron radio officer. One bench supports the SCR-67, SCR-54, and one amplifier with storage batteries held by clamps underneath the bench. on another bench is the SCR-79. a desk for the officer is installed with batteries underneath. a six volt circuit is provided for two lamps connected to storage batteries, and a 110 volt circuit  with two lamps is provided if there is an external power source available.

Components
(Note- all sets seem to have been upgraded to an A model)

 SCR-54 Receiver- (BC-14), Crystal detector; inductively coupled; tuned primary and secondary; 150 foot inverted L antenna; wavelength range, 200 to 600 meters (500 kHz - 1500 kHz)
 SCR-67 Radiotelegraph- (BC-13), transmitting and receiving; for ground stations; has 1 oscillator, 1 modulator, 1 detector, and 2 amplifier vacuum tubes; wavelength range  transmitting 250 to 450 meters (600 kHz - 1200 kHz), and receiving 200 to 600 meters (500 kHz - 1500 kHz).
 SCR-79 Radiotelegraph- (BC-25), transmitting and receiving; consists of an electrostatically coupled vacuum tube oscillator circuit for transmitting, and a vacuum tube detector and 2 stage amplifier for receiving; requires a low resistance antenna. wavelength is 500 to 1.100 meters (250 kHz - 600 kHz)
 SCR-121 Amplifier- (BC-44), 2 stage vacuum tube audio amplifier using iron core transformers

Variants

The SCR-124 was evidently housed in a similar truck, and was assigned to division and Corps level headquarters. it carried the following components-

 SCR-99 Radiotelegraph
 SCR-121
 SCR-54
 SCR-82 battery charger (replaced by SCR-110)
 SCR-79.
 SCR-97 Radiotelephone

See also

 Radio Tractor
 Signal Corps Radio
 Crystal radio

References
 Signal Corps Storage Catalog 
 Radio Communication Pamphlet No. 3 (SCR-54) 
 Radio Communications Pamphlet No. 17 (SCR-79)
 Radio Communications Pamphlet No. 22 (SCR-67)

External links
 https://web.archive.org/web/20100413132056/http://www.gordon.army.mil/ocos/museum/equipment.asp scr and bc lists
 Annual report 
 1922 Congressional hearing 

Amateur radio transmitters
Military radio systems of the United States
Military vehicles introduced in the 1920s